Eric Osei Bonsu (born 5 January 2001) is a Ghanaian professional footballer who plays as a defender for Ghanaian Premier League side Accra Great Olympics.

Career

Great Olympics 
Bonsu started playing in the Ghana Premier League for Accra Great Olympics during the 2019–20 Ghana Premier League season. He made his debut during the first match of the season on 29 December 2020, starting in a match 3–0 loss to Ashanti Gold. He went on to make 14 league appearances that season before the league was put on hold and later cancelled due to the COVID-19 pandemic. With the league set to resume for the 2020–21 Ghana Premier League season, he was named on the club's squad list for the season. On 30 January 2021, during the Ga Mashie Derby, he played the full 90 minutes and helped to kept a clean sheet in a historic 2–0 win over rivals Accra Hears of Oak, the first derby win for Olympics since 2004.

References

External links 

 

Living people
2001 births
Association football defenders
Ghanaian footballers
Accra Great Olympics F.C. players